The men's javelin throw event at the 1951 Pan American Games was held at the Estadio Monumental in Buenos Aires on 3 March. 15 nations took part in the event with 243 athletes participating in 33 events.

Results

References

Athletics at the 1951 Pan American Games
1951